The 1940 Wansbeck by-election was a by-election held in England on 22 July 1940 for the House of Commons constituency of Wansbeck in Northumberland.

Vacancy
The seat became vacant when the Conservative Member of Parliament (MP) Bernard Cruddas resigned from the House of Commons on 12 July 1940.  He had held the seat since the 1931 general election.

Results
The Conservative candidate, Robert Scott, was returned unopposed.  He represented the constituency until his defeat at the 1945 general election.

References

See also
Wansbeck District
1929 Wansbeck by-election
1918 Wansbeck by-election
List of United Kingdom by-elections

1940 elections in the United Kingdom
1940 in England
By-elections to the Parliament of the United Kingdom in Northumberland constituencies
Unopposed by-elections to the Parliament of the United Kingdom in English constituencies
20th century in Northumberland
July 1940 events